Africa Education Review is a peer-reviewed academic journal covering current educational issues. It has been in existence since 1972 under the name Educare.

Indexing and abstracting

The journal is abstracted and indexed in the following bibliographic databases:

Emerging Sources Citation Index
Scopus
International Bibliography of the Social Sciences
EBSCO Education Source
Educational Research Abstracts
ERIC

References

External links
 Electronic Journals Library (EZB)
 PiCarta

Education journals
African studies journals